Alex Drake may refer to:

 Alex Drake (Ashes to Ashes), a fictional character in BBC drama Ashes to Ashes
 Alex Drake (Pretty Little Liars), a fictional character on the American television series Pretty Little Liars

See also
 Alexander Drake (disambiguation)